El Salvador competed at the 1988 Summer Olympics in Seoul, South Korea, from 17 September to 2 October 1988. This was the nation's fourth appearance at the Olympics.

Comité Olímpico de El Salvador sent a total of 6 athletes to the Games, 5 men and 1 women, to compete in 4 sports. Wrestler Gustavo Manzur was chosen to carry his nation's flag during the opening ceremony.

Competitors 
Comité Olímpico de El Salvador selected a team of 6 athletes, 5 men and 1 women, to compete in 4 sports. Wrestler Gustavo Manzur, at age 28, was the oldest athlete of the team, while boxer Henry Martínez was the youngest at age 17.

The following is the list of number of competitors participating in the Games.

Athletics

Men
Combined events

Women
Track & road events

Boxing

Men

Judo

Men

Wrestling

Men's Freestyle

Men's Greco-Roman

See also
El Salvador at the 1987 Pan American Games

References
"El Salvador at the 1988 Seoul Summer Games." Sports-Reference.com. Retrieved on 17 March 2014.
Official Olympic Reports

Nations at the 1988 Summer Olympics
1988
Olympics